Robert Swinburne (c. 1376 – after 1426), of Newcastle upon Tyne, Northumberland, was an English merchant. He was a Member of Parliament for Newcastle-upon-Tyne in April 1414 and 1426.

References

1376 births
15th-century deaths
Politicians from Newcastle upon Tyne
15th-century English politicians
English merchants
English MPs April 1414
English MPs 1426